was an Italian television series.

Plot
Giorgina "Giò" Manzi is a 14-year-old girl from the fictional town of Campo Grugnuccio, who moves to a big city to start high school. In addition to the strong change of environment, the girl will be forced to face the new schoolmates and initially everything will seem to go wrong.

See also
List of Italian television series

External links
 

Italian television series
2009 Italian television series debuts
2009 Italian television series endings